is a Shinto shrine located in Miyazaki, Miyazaki prefecture, Japan. It is dedicated to Emperor Jimmu, Ugayafukiaezu and Tamayori-bime.

Events
Many events are held at the shrine including the annual Yabusame festival on April 3.

The most important is the Aki-no-Taisai held in October. It is a costume parade in honour of Emperor Jinmu (Japan's first emperor) featuring women dressed in gorgeous wedding kimono.

Shinto shrines in Miyazaki Prefecture
Beppyo shrines
Kanpei-taisha